Mario Gavranović (born 24 November 1989) is a Swiss professional footballer who plays as a forward for Süper Lig club Kayserispor and the Switzerland national team.

Club career

Early career
Gavranović began his career with AS Vezia, before he was scouted by Team Ticino U18, the youth academy of FC Lugano. In the 2006–07 season, he played his first professional games in the Swiss Challenge League for FC Lugano. In his second season he scored eight goals in 21 games. In the summer of 2008 he signed for Yverdon-Sport and scored another eight goals in only 20 games. For the 2008–09 season, he moved to Neuchâtel Xamax.

Schalke
After a successful start at Neuchâtel Xamax having scored eight goals in 17 games, Gavranović left his team to sign for Schalke 04 on 1 February 2010. He scored a vital goal for Schalke 04 in the Round of 16 in the Champions League against Valencia, which led his team to a 4–2 victory and a place in the quarter-finals. Gavranović joined fellow Bundesliga side Mainz on a season-long loan deal on 31 August 2011. Mainz reportedly paid €200,000 to secure his services and the loan included a deal for a permanent transfer worth €1.5 million.

FC Zürich
After only making five appearances during his loan spell, Gavranović returned to Schalke at which point he agreed to cancel his contract in May 2012 and moved on a free transfer to FC Zürich in the summer. He made his debut for Zürich on 15 July 2012, and scored his first goal from the penalty spot in the same match, a 1–1 draw with FC Luzern.

Gavranović scored Zürich's winning goal against reigning champions FC Basel on 11 August 2013 in the fifth round of the Swiss Super League. He scored Zürich's first goal as the club twice came from behind to defeat FC Stade Lausanne Ouchy 3-2 in the second round of the Swiss Cup on 15 September. On 24 November, Gavranović netted twice in the second half of Zürich's Super League clash with FC Sion, inspiring his side to a 4–1 victory.

In the Zürich Derby match against Grasshoppers on 1 March 2014, Gavranović scored a goal in either half to give Zürich a 3-1 win. On 21 April 2014, Gavranović scored twice in extra-time to lead Zürich to a 2–0 victory over Basel in the final of the Swiss Cup.

After suffering a knee injury in training at the World Cup, Gavranović was sidelined for the rest of 2014.

Rijeka
On 18 January 2016, Gavranović moved to HNK Rijeka in Croatia. He signed a -year contract with the club and joined their pre-season training camp in Dubai. Gavranović scored on his official club début on 12 February 2016, converting a cross by Roman Bezjak in the 25th minute to double Rijeka's lead against Lokomotiva. In two years with the club Gavranović scored 40 goals in 80 appearances.

Dinamo Zagreb
On 5 January 2018, Gavranović joined Dinamo Zagreb as part of player exchange deal involving Domagoj Pavičić and Luka Capan. He signed a three-year contract with the club and selected the number 11 jersey. With a move to the new club and a successful spring season, Gavranović was determined to secure a place in Switzerland's squad for the 2018 FIFA World Cup in Russia. During his official presentation in Zagreb Gavranović revealed that all of his family members are Dinamo supporters and since the early age he was also encouraged to support the club.

He scored his first goal for the club in a 1–0 win over Slaven Belupo on 4 March. On 7 March, he scored against his former club Rijeka, but Dinamo would go on to lose the match 4–1. He scored again in a 2–0 win over Rudeš on 17 March and then scored against Istra 1961 in a 4–0 away win on 8 April. Gavranović scored twice in a 2–1 away win over rivals Hajduk Split, which moved Dinamo closer to securing a 19th league title.

He was released from Dinamo at the end of his contract on 30 July 2020. However, he returned to the club just three weeks later due to injury of club's first striker Bruno Petković. On 17 October, he scored his first hat-trick for Dinamo as they defeated Gorica 3–2.

International career
Gavranović represented Switzerland on U-21 level in 14 games and scored three goals. On 26 March 2011, he made senior team debut in the 0–0 draw with Bulgaria in a Euro 2012 qualifier. His first goals arrived in a brace scored in a 4–2 friendly win over Croatia on 15 August 2012.

Gavranović was named in the final 23-man squad for the World Cup in Brazil on 13 May 2014. On 29 June, he sustained a serious knee injury in training, ruling him out for the rest of the World Cup and until early 2015.

Gavranović was named in manager Vladimir Petković's 23-man Swiss squad for the 2018 FIFA World Cup in Russia. He played his first ever World Cup match in the second Group E match versus Serbia, entering at the start of the second half and giving an injury time assist which was finished by Xherdan Shaqiri for a 2–1 comeback win.

Gavranović was named in Petković's 26-man squad for the UEFA Euro 2020. On 28 June 2021, he was substituted for Shaqiri in the 73rd minute of the Round of 16 match against France. He scored Switzerland's third goal, tying the score at 3–3. After extra time and a penalty shoot-out, Switzerland won 5–4 (with Gavranović successfully converting his penalty) and qualified for the quarter-finals. That was the first time in history that Switzerland progressed to the European Championship quarter-finals, and the first time since the 1954 FIFA World Cup that they progressed to quarter-finals of a major tournament.

On 15 September 2022, Gavranović announced his retirement from the Swiss national team, after eleven years and 41 appearances in the senior team. His last appearance was thus on 5 June 2022, in a 0–4 defeat to Portugal in the UEFA Nations League.

Personal life 
Gavranović is of Bosnian Croat descent, hailing from Gradačac in Bosnia and Herzegovina. As of 2016, Gavranović is married to Anita, a Bosnian Croat from Derventa. In May 2019, Anita gave birth to a baby girl whom they named Leonie.

Gavranović is a polyglot; he speaks Croatian, Italian, French, German and English.

Career statistics

Club

International

Scores and results list Switzerland's goal tally first, score column indicates score after each Gavranović goal.

Honours
Schalke 04
DFB-Pokal: 2010–11

Zürich
Swiss Cup: 2013–14, 2015–16

Rijeka
Prva HNL: 2016–17
Croatian Cup: 2016–17

Dinamo Zagreb
Prva HNL: 2017–18, 2018–19, 2019–20, 2020–21
Croatian Cup: 2017–18, 2020–21
Croatian Super Cup: 2019

Switzerland U21
UEFA European Under-21 Championship runner-up: 2011

Individual
Croatian Cup top scorer: 2016–17
Football Oscar – Prva HNL Team of the Year: 2017, 2018

References

External links

1989 births
Living people
Sportspeople from Lugano
Association football forwards
Swiss men's footballers
Swiss people of Bosnia and Herzegovina descent
Swiss people of Croatian descent
Switzerland youth international footballers
Switzerland under-21 international footballers
Switzerland international footballers
FC Lugano players
Yverdon-Sport FC players
Neuchâtel Xamax FCS players
FC Schalke 04 players
FC Schalke 04 II players
1. FSV Mainz 05 players
FC Zürich players
HNK Rijeka players
GNK Dinamo Zagreb players
Kayserispor footballers
Swiss Super League players
Swiss Challenge League players
Bundesliga players
Regionalliga players
Croatian Football League players
2014 FIFA World Cup players
2018 FIFA World Cup players
UEFA Euro 2020 players
Swiss expatriate footballers
Swiss expatriate sportspeople in Germany
Expatriate footballers in Germany
Swiss expatriate sportspeople in Croatia
Expatriate footballers in Croatia